Jewell was an unincorporated community in Marin County, California.

In the 1860s, the site was a dairy and pig farm owned by Omar Jewell. When the Northwestern Pacific Railroad was built nearby, Jewell sold a right-of-way across his land and a flagstop called Jewells was set up on the ranch. In the 1930s, a strip of land between Lagunitas Creek and the Sir Francis Drake Highway was subdivided into small lots where city dwellers built weekend cottages. The settlement became known as Jewell because it lay opposite of the Jewell train flagstop.

The National Park Service bought the community alongside the creek and removed the few remaining residents. In 2018 an environmental group tore down the cluster of houses and began to restore the creek to improve the habitat for endangered coho salmon.

References

Former settlements in Marin County, California
Former populated places in California